Carlos José Ochoa (born December 14, 1980, in Nirgua, Yaracuy) is a Venezuelan road bicycle racer for amateur team Gobernación de Yaracuy AGV.

Palmarès 

 2005
 2nd Overall Vuelta a la Independencia Nacional
 1st Stage 1 La Romana
 2nd Overall Vuelta Internacional al Estado Trujillo
 1st Stage 7 Bocono
 1st Stage 8 Circuito al Valle de Motatán
 1st Overall Vuelta a Yacambu-Lara
 1st Stage 2a
 2007
 1st Overall Vuelta a Yacambu-Lara
 1st Stage 2a Cuara
 1st Overall Vuelta Internacional al Estado Trujillo
 1st Stage 4 La Quebrada
 2008
 1st Stage 4 Tour de San Luis
 1st, Overall Vuelta a la Independencia Nacional
 1st Stage 7 Jarabacoa
 1st Stage 8b Santo Domingo
 1st Overall Vuelta a Venezuela
 2009
 5th Overall Vuelta a Venezuela
 2011
 1st Stage 1b Settimana internazionale di Coppi e Bartali (TTT)
2013
1st  Overall Vuelta a Venezuela

Grand Tour general classification results timeline

References

External links 

Venezuelan male cyclists
1980 births
Living people
Vuelta a Venezuela stage winners
People from Yaracuy
21st-century Venezuelan people